James O'Neal Lofton (born March 6, 1974 in Los Angeles, California) is a former shortstop in Major League Baseball who played briefly for the Boston Red Sox during the 2001 season. Listed at 5' 9", 170 lb., he was a switch-hitter and threw right-handed.

In an eight-game career, Lofton was a .192 hitter (5-for-26) with one run, one double, one RBI, and two stolen bases. In seven fielding appearances, he committed two errors in 25 chances for a .920 fielding percentage.

Lofton also played in the Boston, Baltimore and Cincinnati minor league systems (1993–2007), as well as in several independent leagues. He was named an All-Star in the Pioneer (1994) and Western (2000) leagues. In 14 minor league seasons, he was a .271 hitter with 57 home runs and 533 RBI in 1264 games.

Lofton is not believed to be related to former MLB outfielder Kenny Lofton. 

Lofton has two daughters Jasmine Lofton and Jamie Lofton.

External links

The Baseball Cube

1974 births
Living people
Major League Baseball shortstops
Boston Red Sox players
Pawtucket Red Sox players
Aberdeen IronBirds players
Nashua Pride players
Coastal Bend Aviators players
Sonoma County Crushers players
Tri-City Posse players
Baseball players from Los Angeles
Minor league baseball coaches
John C. Fremont High School alumni
Billings Mustangs players
Bowie Baysox players
Broncos de Reynosa players
African-American baseball players
American expatriate baseball players in Mexico
Burlington Bees players
Charleston AlleyCats players
Princeton Reds players
Trenton Thunder players
Winston-Salem Warthogs players